Fatima Bara (born 21 February 1990) is an Algerian footballer who plays as a defender for ASE Alger Centre and the Algeria women's national football team.

Club career
Bara has played for Alger Centre in Algeria.

International career
Bara competed for Algeria at the 2018 Africa Women Cup of Nations, playing in two matches.

References

External links
 

1990 births
Living people
People from El Harrach
Footballers from Algiers
Algerian women's footballers
Women's association football defenders
Algeria women's international footballers
21st-century Algerian people